Maļinova (historically and locally known as Maļinovka) is a mid-size village in Maļinova Parish, Augšdaugava Municipality in the Latgale region of Latvia. It is a parish centre. It is located 19 km northeast of Daugavpils at the A13 national road/European route E262.

The inhabited locality grew up out of the former Malinovka village after World War II as a centre of a selsoviet and the Znamya Oktyabrya kolkhoz.

Today Maļinova is the home of the parish administration, a house of culture, library, feldsher station and the Elijah the Prophet Orthodox church.

References

External links 
 Information about Maļinova in the Placenames Database of Latvia 
 Website of the Maļinova parish administration 

Augšdaugava Municipality
Towns and villages in Latvia
Latgale